Ratchaburi Hospital is the main hospital of Ratchaburi Province, Thailand. It is classified by the Ministry of Public Health as a regional hospital. It has a Collaborative Project to Increase Production of Rural Doctors (CPIRD) Medical Education Center which trains doctors for the MOPH-Mahidol CPIRD Program.

History 
The foundation stone for Ratchaburi Hospital was laid on 2 April 1941 and the hospital opened in 1941, consisting of a small patient building, doctor's lodgings, and a kitchen. Initially, the hospital had a capacity of 25 beds. The hospital was later expanded and between 1951 and 1952, hospital operations were transferred to the Ministry of Public Health.

On 30 September 2003, the hospital received ISO 9002:20031 accreditation and in 2006 received HA (Hospital Accreditation). Ratchaburi Hospital operates 855 beds (plus 40 ICU beds) (2018).

See also 

Healthcare in Thailand
 Hospitals in Thailand
 List of hospitals in Thailand
 Praboromarajchanok Medicine Program, Mahidol University

References 

Hospitals in Thailand
1941 establishments in Thailand